General McCarthy may refer to:

Dennis M. McCarthy (born 1945), U.S. Marine Corps lieutenant general
James P. McCarthy (born 1935), U.S. Air Force four-star general
Michael J. McCarthy (general) (fl. 1960s–2000s), U.S. Air Force major general

See also
Chester E. McCarty (1905–1999), U.S. Air Force major general
Roy V. McCarty (fl. 1980s–2020s), South Carolina Army National Guard major general